Polo is a municipality of the Barahona Province in southwestern Dominican Republic, known for its green and high mountains and for growing fine coffee.

The small town of Polo is also known for having El Polo Magnético (the magnetic pole), an area on a mountain near the village. If a car is stopped at the right place, and put in neutral, the car seems to be rolling up the hill. Rather than being caused by a magnetic field in the surrounding landscape, this phenomenon is produced by the gravity hill optical illusion.

Climate

References

External links 
Magnetic Hill International: Polo Magnético
http://www.polomagnetico.com/ - Daily news of Polo (Spanish)
http://www.williamramos.tv/blog/polo-un-pueblo-en-barahona-que-esconde-grandes-tesoros-conocias-alguno/ - Video of the hidden paradise of Polo
https://www.youtube.com/watch?v=DzOv6Hh5EAE/ - Kiskeya Life: Explicando el 'Polo Magnético' de Barahona: ¿realidad o mito?

Populated places in Barahona Province
Municipalities of the Dominican Republic
Gravity hills